Rajani Venugopal (born 28 May 1969) is a former Test and One Day International (ODI) cricketer who represented the India national women's cricket team. She played as a right-handed batter and left-arm medium-fast bowler. She played six Tests and nine ODIs.

References

Living people
1969 births
Cricketers from Hyderabad, India
Indian women cricketers
India women Test cricketers
India women One Day International cricketers
Sportswomen from Hyderabad, India

Air India women cricketers
Railways women cricketers
20th-century Indian women
20th-century Indian people